Gomphurus is a genus of clubtails in the family of dragonflies known as Gomphidae. There are about 13 described species in Gomphurus.

Gomphurus was formerly considered a subgenus of Gomphus, but has recently been promoted to genus rank along with Phanogomphus, Stenogomphurus and Hylogomphus.

Species
These 13 species belong to the genus Gomphurus:

 Gomphurus crassus (Hagen in Selys, 1878) (handsome clubtail)
 Gomphurus dilatatus (Rambur, 1842) (blackwater clubtail)
 Gomphurus externus (Hagen in Selys, 1858) (plains clubtail)
 Gomphurus fraternus (Say, 1840) (midland clubtail)
 Gomphurus gonzalezi (Dunkle, 1992) (Tamaulipan clubtail)
 Gomphurus hybridus (Williamson, 1902) (cocoa clubtail)
 Gomphurus lineatifrons (Calvert, 1921) (splendid clubtail)
 Gomphurus lynnae (Paulson, 1983) (Columbia clubtail)
 Gomphurus modestus (Needham, 1942) (gulf coast clubtail)
 Gomphurus ozarkensis (Westfall, 1975) (Ozark clubtail)
 Gomphurus septima (Westfall, 1956) (Septima's clubtail)
 Gomphurus vastus (Walsh, 1862) (cobra clubtail)
 Gomphurus ventricosus (Walsh, 1863) (skillet clubtail)

References

Further reading

 
 
 
 
 
 
 

Gomphidae